TF-19 Wasp is a drone flamethrower attachment designed by Throwflame. It was designed for remote ignition for aerial and ground targets.

Specifications 
The attachment can work with drones which can carry weights of up to 5 pounds, and can reach a target 25 feet or 7 meters away. The duration of fire is up to 100 seconds with its gallon of fuel.

References

Flamethrowers